Holod is a commune in Bihor County, Crișana, Romania. It is composed of eight villages: Dumbrava (Tenkemocsár), Dumbrăvița (Kisdombró), Forosig (Forrószeg), Hodiș (Káptalanhodos), Holod, Lupoaia (Farkaspatak), Valea Mare de Codru (Alsópatak) and Vintere (Venter).

At the 2011 census, 77.2% of inhabitants were Romanians, 21.3% Roma and 0.8% Hungarians.

References

Holod
Localities in Crișana